Webster is a town in Merrimack County, New Hampshire, United States. The population was 1,913 at the 2020 census.

History 
A part of Boscawen until 1860, the town takes its name from American statesman Daniel Webster.

Geography 
The Blackwater River flows from north to south through the town, leading to the Contoocook River in Hopkinton. The entire town is part of the Merrimack River watershed.

Adjacent municipalities 
 Salisbury (north)
 Boscawen (east)
 Concord (southeast)
 Hopkinton (south)
 Warner (west)

Demographics 

At the 2000 census there were 1,579 people, 581 households, and 464 families living in the town.  The population density was 56.6 people per square mile (21.9/km).  There were 672 housing units at an average density of 24.1 per square mile (9.3/km).  The racial makeup of the town was 98.86% White, 0.06% African American, 0.06% Native American, 0.38% Asian, 0.06% from other races, and 0.57% from two or more races. Hispanic or Latino of any race were 0.13%.

Of the 581 households 34.9% had children under the age of 18 living with them, 68.3% were married couples living together, 7.4% had a female householder with no husband present, and 20.1% were non-families. 14.5% of households were one person and 4.6% were one person aged 65 or older.  The average household size was 2.71 and the average family size was 2.99.

The age distribution was 25.8% under the age of 18, 5.3% from 18 to 24, 31.7% from 25 to 44, 27.9% from 45 to 64, and 9.2% 65 or older.  The median age was 39 years. For every 100 females, there were 94.0 males.  For every 100 females age 18 and over, there were 93.2 males.

The median household income was $54,052 and the median family income  was $57,396. Males had a median income of $35,449 versus $24,250 for females. The per capita income for the town was $20,852.  About 3.6% of families and 5.0% of the population were below the poverty line, including 5.0% of those under age 18 and 5.4% of those age 65 or over.

References

External links 
 
 New Hampshire Economic and Labor Market Information Bureau Profile

 
Towns in Merrimack County, New Hampshire
Towns in New Hampshire